Jacob Broughton Nelson (born July 1898, date of death unknown) has been proclaimed the founder of Phi Kappa secondary school fraternity.

Biography
Nelson was born in July 1898 in Brundidge, Alabama. In the 1900 census Nelson was listed as the son of Jacob Boone Nelson and Laura Hill Locke Nelson in Summerfield, Alabama. In 1910 they were living in Dellwood, Jackson County, Florida. He later lived with them in Troy, Alabama. Jacob Boone Nelson (31 Jan. 1851-11 Dec. 1916) was a circuit preacher for the Methodist Episcopal Church, South and is thought to be Jacob Broughton Nelson's uncle.

In the years 1914-1916 Nelson attended the Southern University Preparatory School in Greensboro, Alabama. There, he was a member of the Glee Club and the Alpha chapter of Phi Kappa secondary school fraternity. He has been described as being an ambitious and popular young fellow who was about 5' 6" tall with brown hair, of medium build, and who wore round, wire-rimmed spectacles. After his tenure at Southern, Nelson moved back to Troy, where he founded the Upsilon Chapter of Phi Kappa. Over the next few years, he oversaw the chartering of Phi Kappa chapters at the Emory University Academy in Oxford, Georgia (Gamma Beta) and at the Gulf Coast Military Academy in Gulfport, Mississippi (Mu Theta).

Fate
One historian has stated that Nelson died of tuberculosis in Colorado, but the Bureau of Statistics in Colorado has no record of this. There was no one in Troy or any Phi Kappa chapter who remembers seeing Nelson after 1920.

Student societies in the United States
1898 births
People from Brundidge, Alabama
Year of death unknown
Activists from Alabama